Sooty Heights is a British children's television series, created and presented by Richard Cadell, co-stars Liana Bridges and Brenda Longman, produced by Granada Television, and aired on the CITV block of ITV from 27 September 1999 to 11 December 2000. It is the successor to the children's series Sooty & Co and the first programme to feature Cadell as Sooty's right-hand man (and subsequent owner), following the retirement of Matthew Corbett in 1998. The show focuses on Sooty, Sweep, Soo, Scampi, Richard, and Liana running their new home and business place, the Sooty Heights hotel. The programme operated on the same sitcom format first used by The Sooty Show, and retained some elements from the previous show such as Sooty's camper van and the characters' bedroom.

The series ran for two series, with each consisting of 13 episodes. At its conclusion, Bridges left the programme, while the show was revamped and renamed to Sooty in 2001.

Cast
 Richard Cadell – The programme's main presenter, who maintained many aspects of The Sooty Show and Sooty & Co in Sooty Heights, including the sitcom format, various gags.
 Liana Bridges – Cadell's co-presenter, who also handled the responsibility of narrator alongside Longman.
 Brenda Longman – The voice of Soo on the programme, who also made a physical appearance as the character of Dotty, whom Longman devised to be an eccentric hotel owner who bore no rivalry with the others, and mainly offered help with problems running Sooty Heights.

Episodes

Series 1 (1999)
 "Desperately Seeking Squeaky" (27 September 1999) Guest Starring: Brenda Longman as Dotty
 "The Hottest Place in Town" (4 October 1999)
 "Water, Water Everywhere" (11 October 1999)
 "The Best of Health" (18 October 1999) Guest Starring: Kriss Akabusi
 "Hidden Treasure" (25 October 1999) Guest Starring Paul Crone as TV Reporter
 "Friends and Romans" (1 November 1999) Guest Starring: Robin Parkinson and Marcia Warren as Mr and Mrs Spratley
 "Battle of the Bands" (8 November 1999) Guest Starring: Cleopatra
 "The Great Supremo" (15 November 1999) Guest Starring: Stephen Mulhern as The Great Supremo
 "Jumble" (22 November 1999) Guest Starring Diana Payan as Auntie Juanita and Robert Duncan as Art Deeler
 "Fast Food" (29 November 1999) Guest Starring: Glenn Cunningham as Angry Man
 "Bumps in the Night" (6 December 1999)
 "Double-O Sooty" (13 December 1999) Guest Starring: Bob Sherman as Hyrem P. Shooter
 "A Christmas Carrot" (20 December 1999)

Series 2 (2000)
 "To Share is to Care" (18 September 2000) Guest Starring: Matthew Kelly
 "Guard Dog Wanted" (25 September 2000)
 "Vets and Pets" (2 October 2000) Guest Starring: Eva Gray
 "Manic Organic" (9 October 2000)
 "Undercover Sooty" (16 October 2000)
 "Vote for Soo" (23 October 2000) Guest Starring: Larry Dann as Mr Whalley and Lynn Robertson Bruce as Suds the Robot
 "Too Many Cooks" (30 October 2000) Guest Starring: Helen Leaderer as Mrs Frumpton
 "A Sense of Business" (6 November 2000) Guest Starring: Tim Whitnall as Mr Cross and Abbi Dupre as Ms Starr
 "Dog Brain of Britain" (13 November 2000) Guest Starring: Liz Dawn as Liz, Danielle Nicholls as Nesta Table and Steve Money as Security Officer
 "The Hounds of Music" (20 November 2000) Guest Starring: Philip Delancy as Rolfe
 "You Must Be Joking" (27 November 2000) Guest Starring: Brian Blessed
 "The Quest" (4 December 2000)
 "Sooty and the Beanstalk" (11 December 2000)

References
 Sooty Online
 MTEDb Sooty Heights

ITV children's television shows
British children's comedy television series
British children's musical television series
British television shows featuring puppetry
1990s British children's television series
1990s British workplace comedy television series
2000s British children's television series
2000s British workplace comedy television series
1999 British television series debuts
2000 British television series endings
English-language television shows
ITV comedy
Television series about bears
Television series by ITV Studios
Television shows produced by Granada Television
Television series by Mattel Creations
Fictional hotels
Sooty
Gullane Entertainment